The University City Symphony Orchestra (UCSO) is a non-profit community orchestra, established in 1960, giving amateur musicians in the St. Louis, Missouri area the opportunity to play orchestral literature. Though drawing on musicians from throughout the surrounding area, it rehearses and holds the majority of its free concerts in University City, Missouri.

Currently under the direction of Dr. Leon Burke III, the orchestra sponsors the William Schatzkamer Young Artists Competition, partners with other area musical organizations and plays throughout St. Louis area and surrounding counties though the Center of Creative Arts (COCA) is home to most of its performances.

History 
The University City Symphony Orchestra was established in 1960, in part to provide summer employment for the musicians of the St. Louis Symphony Orchestra. Its first President, Lily Kaufman was wife of then-Mayor Nathan Kaufman.

People
 Charles J. Schuder president (2002–2005), (2006–Present)

Music Directors
 Leon Burke III (1997–Present)
 William Schatzkamer (1960–1997)

See also
University City Symphony Orchestra – Programs by Season

External links 
 University City Symphony Orchestra

Musical groups established in 1960
American orchestras
1960 establishments in Missouri
Performing arts in Missouri
Musical groups from Missouri